Aconodes bilobatus is a species of beetle in the family Cerambycidae. It was described by Stephan von Breuning in 1939. It is known from India.

References

Aconodes
Beetles described in 1939
Taxa named by Stephan von Breuning (entomologist)